Caeculidae, also known as rake-legged mites, is a family of mites in the order Trombidiformes, the only family of the superfamily Caeculoidea. There are about 9 genera and about 100 described species in Caeculidae which occur world-wide. The oldest records of the family are from the Cenomanian aged Burmese amber, belonging to the extant genus Procaeculus.

Genera
These six genera belong to the family Caeculidae:
 Allocaeculus Franz, 1952
 Andocaeculus Coineau, 1974
 Caeculus Dufour, 1832
 Calocaeculus Coineau, 1974
 Microcaeculus Franz, 1952
 Neocaeculus Coineau, 1967
Procaeculus Jacot 1936

References

Further reading

External links

 

Trombidiformes
Acari families